Jewell Jackson McCabe (born August 2, 1945) is an American feminist, business executive, social and political activist. She was a leader of, and spokesperson for, the National Coalition of 100 Black Women's movement in the mid to late 1970s in New York City and for the national movement throughout the United States in the early 1980s into the 1990s, as founder of the organization which grew out of her New York City stewardship. In 1993 she became the first woman in 84 years to be in serious contention for the presidency of the civil rights organizations NAACP. Distinguished as an activist Jewell collaborated with several leading African American women leaders of varied and often opposing political ideologies who had in common their opposition to the million man march for excluding black women, including Angela Davis.

Early life 
Jewell Jackson was born in Washington, D.C. on August 2, 1945 to Harold "Hal" B. Jackson and Julia [nee Hawkins] Jackson. Hal Jackson [broadcast pioneer] and his partner Percy E. Sutton [politician] started Inner City Broadcasting. ICB began after the U.S. Federal Communications Commission ruled that there be an increase in black radio and television. ICB owned eighteen radio stations including WBLS-FM where Hal was a broadcaster. Hal was known as the "Godfather of Black Radio" and opened doors of opportunity to countless artists – Valerie Simpson and Alicia Keys'performed during Hal Jackson's funeral.
Julia, Jewell's mother, was active with The Links, Incorporated, the Urban League Guild, and Jack and Jill. Jewell's earliest influences also came from her paternal aunts. Her aunt Alice [Jackson] Cornish was an elementary school teacher in Washington, DC, one of the first to integrate Washington D.C.'s elementary school system in the early 20th century. An accomplished pianist Essie [Jackson] Goldwire was the first black to graduate from the Boston Conservatory of Music. Jewell's older sister was an elementary school teacher. Jewell's older brother, Hal B. Jackson, Jr. was appointed a Milwaukee Circuit Court Judge in 1972 by Governor Pat Lucy, making HBJ, Jr.the first African-American Judge in the state of Wisconsin. Hal Jr. had attended Lawrence Academy in Groton, Massachusetts, (he has been inducted into the Lawrence Academy Hall of Fame) and both Colgate and Marquette University.

Early career 
Jewell Jackson McCabe was elected to the board of the Women's Forum in 1975 under the leadership of her friend and colleague founding President Elinor Guggenheimer. In 1977 as part of the campaign to support New York City, during the aftermath of the 1975 fiscal crisis — the Women's Forum represented by Ellen Sulzberger Straus who organized, recruited and joined with Jewell Jackson McCabe, President, Coalition of Black Women and Marife Hernandez, President, of the Conference of Puerto Rican Women —  together as co-chairs they formed WUNY (Women United for New York) to promote unity, mutual support and gain recognition for the impact the city's female leadership had on the economic health of New York.

Her strategic communications company is a full service minority owned organization, combining a broad range of marketing skill, competitiveness training on effective internal and external management capabilities. As strategic communications consultant - Jewell institutionalized Panasonic Kid Witness News, running the program for a decade — the company brought the successful program inside creating an operating business unit to takeover program management. This occurred after JJMcC Associates developed the Essex County focused Panasonic pilot marketing program for 5th and sixth graders.  Jewell expanded the initial 17 elementary schools in the New York City metro tri-state area to 200 schools nationally — in 35 states and the District of Columbia. Jewell's design included methodology utilizing teacher and student training videos. The refreshed design engaged students nationally in competition naming various categories of their videos. Panasonic provided fully equipped video studios per school for their student hands-on video education initiative. A high visibility gala showcasing videos in an annual student competition — culminating in an "A-kid-emy Awards" dinner program for students, their parents and teachers.

On October 18, 1994 the United States William Jefferson Clinton attended the Democratic National Committee Jewish Leadership Forum dinner at the Corcoran Gallery of Art. The President announced his intention to appoint Jewell Jackson McCabe to be the first African American member of the U.S. Holocaust Memorial Council with oversight of the Holocaust Museum, where she was a member of the Holocaust Council's congressionally mandated Committee on Conscience. Governor Mario M. Cuomo appointed Jewell Jackson McCabe to the New York State Council on Fiscal and Economic priorities; he also appointed her chair of the New York State's Job Training Partnership Council.

Accolades and honors 

Jewell Jackson McCabe became an honorary member of the first black female sorority, Alpha Kappa Alpha founded in 1908.

The Stone Mountain Lithonia Chapter, near Atlanta, Georgia expanded the chapter's mentorship program to become The Jewell Jackson McCabe Emerging Leaders Institute, Inc. (ELI). ELI is a not-for-profit organization committed to developing a diverse organization that fosters creativity, innovation and entrepreneurial spirit by enriching the lives of women through leadership opportunities, personal and professional learning, and cultural experiences.

John Robinson of the Boston Globe wrote "McCabe has become... a major player on Gotham's exclusive, highly competitive scene that her photograph has begun appearing on the social pages of the New York Times."

In April 1993 Jewell Jackson McCabe was the lead candidate of four finalists in the NAACP presidential campaign."

References

Further reading
Lanker, Brian. I Dream a World, Stewart, Tabori & Chang, 1989, pp. 82–83.
Notable Black American Women, edited by Jessie Carney Smith, Gale, 1990, pp. 693–694.
"New York Times", October 26, 1981, Brozan, Nadine, Coalition Goes National https://www.nytimes.com/1981/10/26/style/coalition-of-black-women-goes-national.html
NYTimes Opinion Page "Riders on the Storm" Published: October 15, 1995 NYTimes.com
"New York Times" "Style At Plaza and Met Echoes of the Past"October 2, 198♙ https://www.nytimes.com/1982/10/02/style/at-plaza-and-met-echoes-of-the-past.html
"New York Times" "Style Black Women Discuss Issue of Power"January 1, 198♙ https://www.nytimes.com/1985/01/26/style/black-women-discuss-issue-of-power.html
Atlanta Journal and Constitution, March 23, 1993, p. 13D.
Boston Globe, March 19, 1992, p. 79.
Chicago Tribune, January 10, 1993, p. 9.
Noel, Pamela. "New Battler for Black Women", Ebony, February 1984, pp. 43–50; 
Ebony, September 1988, pp. 52–55; July 1993, pp. 68–71.
Encyclopedia of African American Business
"On the Rise: Jewell McCabe", Fortune, August 17, 1987, p. 93.
Newsweek, September 5, 1994, p. 36.
"Volunteerism: New Paths", The New York Times, June 3, 1979, p. 56.
Philadelphia Inquirer, April 3, 1995, p. 9A.
New York Voice, Black Women In Focus, "First Candace Awards Herald Black [Women] Achievement", Saturday, October 9, 1982.
Keetley, Dawn; Pettegrew, John (2002). Public Women, Public Words: 1960 to the present. Madison House. .
Middlebury College Magazine. Middlebury College. 1985.
The New York Times Magazine. New York Times. 1995-10
Carey), New York (State) Governor (1975-1982 :; Carey, Hugh L. (1994). Public Papers of Hugh L. Carey, Fifty-first Governor of the State of New York, 1981. The State.
Constitution, United States Congress House Committee on the Judiciary Subcommittee on the (2012). Susan B. Anthony and Frederick Douglass Prenatal Nondiscrimination Act of 2011: Hearing Before the Subcommittee on the Constitution of the Committee on the Judiciary, House of Representatives, One Hundred Twelfth Congress, First Session, on H.R. 3541, December 6, 2011. U.S. Government Printing Office.
Cuomo), New York (State) Governor (1983-:; Cuomo, Mario Matthew (1990). Public Papers of Governor Mario M. Cuomo, 1986. State of New York.
Lester, Joan Steinau (1996-10-01). Taking Charge: Every Woman's Action Guide to Personal, Political & Professional Success. Conari Press. .
Carbado, Devon (1999-07). Black Men on Race, Gender, and Sexuality: A Critical Reader. NYU Press. .
Springer, Kimberly (1999-08-01). Still Lifting, Still Climbing: Afric
Hine, Darlene Clark (1995). Black Women in America: An Historical Encyclopedia. Carlson. .
Smith, Jessie Carney (2006). Encyclopedia of African American Business: K-Z. Greenwood Publishing Group. .
Onyx Woman. Jackson Pub. & Communications. 1998.
Upscale: The Successful Black Magazine. Upscale Communications. 1997.
Smith, Jessie Carney; Palmisano, Joseph M. (2000). Reference Library of Black America. Gale Group, Incorporated. .
Vital Issues: The Journal of African American Speeches. Bethune-DuBois Publications. 1997.
Strong Men & Women: The Series : Excellence in Leadership. Virginia Power/North Carolina Power. 2005.  
Council, New York State Job Training Partnership (1986). Report of the New York State Job Training Partnership Council. The Council.
Committee, Committee for Economic Development Research and Policy; Development, Committee for Economic (1995). Who Will Pay for Your Retirement?: The Looming Crisis : a Statement. Committee for Economic Development. 
Governor's Coordination and Special Services Plan for JTPA and Related Programs in New York State ... New York State Job Training Partnership Council. 1988.
Governor, New York (State) (1989). Public Papers 
Governor, New York (State) (1989). Public Papers [of the Governors].
Cuomo), New York (State) Governor (1983-:; Cuomo, Mario Matthew (1989). Public Papers of Governor Mario M. Cuomo, 1984. State of New York.
Bois, William Edward Burghardt Du (1983). Crisis. Crisis Publishing Company.
"1950 To Present." Oxford African American Studies Center, oxfordaasc.com/page/1950-to-present. 
From Suffrage to the Senate: America's Political Women: An Encyclopedia of Leaders, Causes & Issues (Two Volume Set)

External links 
 New York University
 Black History Makers
 
 
 CUNY-TV "Eldridge & Co" 
 

1945 births
Living people
African-American businesspeople
American businesspeople
Bard College alumni
People from Washington, D.C.
American women in business
African-American feminists
21st-century African-American people
21st-century African-American women
20th-century African-American people
20th-century African-American women